Jonathan Nichols Jr. (October 24, 1712 – September 8, 1756) was a deputy governor of the Colony of Rhode Island and Providence Plantations.  He was the son of former Deputy Governor Jonathan Nichols Sr. and Elizabeth Lawton.  Nichols became Deputy Governor in November 1753 when his predecessor, Joseph Whipple III, resigned amid the collapse of his personal fortune, and Nichols completed his term.  In 1755 Nichols was again selected as Deputy Governor, completing his first one-year term, then dying during his second year in office.

Nichols is credited with building a house in Newport in 1748, later known as the Hunter House.  Following his death, the house was owned by Deputy Governor Joseph Wanton Jr., a loyalist, and following the American Revolutionary War was owned by William Hunter, a United States Senator, and ambassador to Brazil.

Images

Ancestry 

The ancestry of Jonathan Nichols Jr. is found in Austin's Genealogical Dictionary of Rhode Island.

See also

 List of lieutenant governors of Rhode Island
 List of colonial governors of Rhode Island
 Colony of Rhode Island and Providence Plantations

References

Bibliography

Further reading

External links
Hunter House article
State list of lieutenant governors of Rhode Island

1712 births
1756 deaths
People of colonial Rhode Island
Politicians from Newport, Rhode Island